Jola (Joola) or Diola is a dialect continuum spoken in Senegal, the Gambia, and Guinea-Bissau. It belongs to the Bak branch of the Niger–Congo language family.

Name
The name Jola is an exonym, and may be from the Mandinka word joolaa 'one who pays back'. There is no widespread endonym used by all of the Jola speakers.

Languages
The primary branches of Jola proper and to some extent Central Jola are not mutually intelligible. The main varieties are:

Bayot
Jola proper
 Kwatay (Kuwaataay), spoken along the coast south of the Casamance River.
 Karon–Mlomp
 Karon, spoken along the coast of Casamance south of Diouloulou.
 Mlomp
Central Jola
 Jola-Fonyi (Kujamatay), spoken around Bignona. The official standard.
 Bandial, spoken in a small area south of the Casamance River.
 Gusilay, spoken in the village of Thionck Essyl.
 Jola-Felupe (Ediamat), spoken in a handful of villages south of Oussouye in Oussouye Department. Kerak may be a dialect.
 (Jola) Kasa, spoken around Oussouye.

Bayot
Bayot, spoken around Ziguinchor, is grammatically Jola, apart from a non-Jola pronominal system. However, perhaps half its vocabulary is non-Jola and even non-Atlantic. It may therefore be a language isolate with substantial Jola borrowing (relexification). In any case, Bayot is clearly distinct from (other) Jola languages.

Reconstruction
Some Proto-Joola reconstructions of stable lexical roots by Segerer (2016) are:

References

External links
Kujamaat Jóola Folklore and Language materials

 
Bak languages
Languages of Senegal